Frank Schaffer (born 23 October 1958 in Stalinstadt (today Eisenhüttenstadt), Bezirk Frankfurt) is an East German retired athlete who specialised in the 400 metres.

He won the bronze medal in the 400 metres at the 1980 Summer Olympics in a lifetime best time of 44.87 seconds. He also assisted the East German team of Klaus Thiele, Andreas Knebel and Volker Beck in winning the silver medal in the 4 × 400 metres relay.

His personal best time of 44.87 seconds ranks him eighth among German 400 m sprinters, behind Thomas Schönlebe, Erwin Skamrahl, Ingo Schultz, Karl Honz, Hartmut Weber, Mathias Schersing and Jens Carlowitz.

Frank Schaffer retired from athletics in 1984.

References

1958 births
Living people
Sportspeople from Eisenhüttenstadt
People from Bezirk Frankfurt
East German male sprinters
Olympic athletes of East Germany
Athletes (track and field) at the 1980 Summer Olympics
Olympic silver medalists for East Germany
Olympic bronze medalists for East Germany
Medalists at the 1980 Summer Olympics
Olympic silver medalists in athletics (track and field)
Olympic bronze medalists in athletics (track and field)
Recipients of the Patriotic Order of Merit in bronze